Rhys Williams (born 8 December 1989) is a Welsh professional rugby league footballer who plays as a er for the Salford Red Devils in the Betfred Super League and Wales at international level.

He has played at club level for the Warrington Wolves in the Super League, and on loan from Warrington at Crusaders RL, Castleford and Salford in the Super League and the Swinton Lions in the Championship. He also played for the Central Queensland Capras in the Queensland Cup and the London Broncos in the Championship and the Super League.

Background
Williams was born in Wrexham, Wales.

He attended Argoed High School.

He then played rugby union for Mold RFC and Llanelli Scarlets, before switching to rugby league.

Playing career

Warrington
Williams scored his first try for Warrington in the 68–16 win over Salford at Murrayfield on 1 May 2010, at the Magic Weekend in Edinburgh.

Crusaders RL
At the beginning of the 2011 season, Williams went back to his hometown of Wrexham to play for the Crusaders on loan. He scored his first try for the club against Salford at the Millennium Stadium on 13 February 2011, at Magic Weekend in Cardiff. After 6 games with the Welsh club, he was recalled to Warrington.

Castleford
He later spent time on loan at Castleford.

Salford
Williams went on loan to the Salford club.

Central Queensland Capras
In 2014, Rhys joined the Central Queensland Capras in the Intrust Super Cup.

London Broncos
In August 2014, Williams signed a contract that would see him move back to England in 2015. He signed with a Championship club, the London Broncos.

In October 2019, Williams signed a contract to join Super League side Salford.  Williams left London having scored 100 tries for the club in 152 games.

Salford (Second Spell)
On 17 October 2020, he played in the 2020 Challenge Cup Final defeat for Salford against Leeds at Wembley Stadium in which he scored a sensational length of the field try.

International career
Williams was named in Wales team to face England at the Keepmoat Stadium, Doncaster prior to England's departure for the 2008 Rugby League World Cup. He has subsequently earned a further 9 caps for Wales, including several games during the 2010 Alitalia European Cup. During that tournament Williams scored a hat-trick of tries against Scotland.

Having won the European Cup, Wales earned a spot in the 2011 Rugby League Four Nations. Again, Williams was named in the Welsh squad for the end of season tournament, and played for Wales in every match, scoring a try against Australia.

In 2012, two tries in a fixture against France saw Williams overtake Iestyn Harris to become Wales' all-time leading try scorer.

He played represented Wales in the 2013 Rugby League World Cup.

In October 2014, Williams played in the 2014 European Cup. He scored a try in the opening game against Scotland.

In October and November 2015, Williams played in the 2015 European Cup.

In October 2016, Williams played in the 2017 World Cup qualifiers, scoring two tries in the country's opening game against Serbia.

He was selected in the Wales 9s squad for the 2019 Rugby League World Cup 9s.

References

External links

London Broncos profile
SL profile
Celtic Crusaders profile
Former Mold Starlet Rhys Williams Aiming For a Shot at the Big Time with the Warrington Wolves
Evans twins named in Wales squad
Wales look to restore lost pride
Wales 42–12 Ireland
Salford 16–68 Warrington
Rhys Williams happy with season so far at Warrington
Warrington Wolves coach Tony Smith signs new contract
(archived by web.archive.org) Statistics at rlwc2017.com
Wales profile
Welsh profile

1989 births
Living people
Castleford Tigers players
Crusaders Rugby League players
Central Queensland Capras players
Footballers who switched code
London Broncos players
Rugby league centres
Rugby league wingers
Salford Red Devils players
Rugby league players from Flintshire
Swinton Lions players
Wales national rugby league team players
Warrington Wolves players
Welsh rugby league players